Elections to the House of Representatives were held in Pennsylvania on October 14, 1794, for the Fourth Congress.

Background
Thirteen Representatives, 8 Anti-Administration (Democratic-Republican) and 5 Pro-Administration (Federalist), had been elected in the previous election on an at-large basis, the last time that Pennsylvania elected all of its representatives at-large.  Ten incumbents (6 Anti-Administration and 4 Pro-Administration) ran for re-election.

Congressional districts
For the 1794 elections, Pennsylvania divided itself into 12 districts, one of which (the ) was a plural district, with 2 Representatives.  These districts remained in use until redistricting after the Census of 1800.  
The  consisted of the City of Philadelphia
The  consisted of Philadelphia County
The  consisted of Chester and Delaware Counties
The  (2 seats) consisted of Montgomery, Bucks and Northampton Counties
The  consisted of Berks and Luzerne County
The  consisted of Northumberland and Dauphin Counties
The  consisted of Lancaster County
The  consisted of York County
The  consisted of Mifflin and Cumberland County
The  consisted of Bedford, Huntingdon and Franklin Counties
The  consisted of Westmoreland and Fayette Counties
The  consisted of Allegheny and Washington Counties

The counties that made up the 5th district did not border each other.  That district was therefore made up of two separate pieces rather than being a single contiguous entity

Note: Many of these counties covered much larger areas in 1794 than they do today, having since been divided into numerous counties

Election returns
Ten incumbents (6 Democratic-Republicans and 4 Federalists) ran for re-election. The incumbents James Armstrong (F), from the 9th district, William Montgomery (DR) from the 11th district, and John Smilie (DR) from the 12th district did not run for re-election.  Smilie would later return to the House in 1798, where he would remain until his death in 1812.  Of the ten who ran for re-election, 6 (4 Democratic-Republicans and 2 Federalists) were re-elected. A total of 9 Democratic-Republicans and 4 Federalists were elected, a net gain of one seat for the Democratic-Republicans over the previous election.

Election results are unavailable from the 5th, 7th, 8th, and 11th districts, and are incomplete for the 9th.

The Governor of Pennsylvania only issued certification for Samuel Sitgreaves (F). On July 10, 1795, before the House could act on the dispute, Morris died. The House voted Richards the legitimate winner of 2nd place, with the revised vote totals being 1,791 for Richards and 1,688 for Morris

Special elections
Daniel Hiester (DR), re-elected to the 5th district, resigned on July 1, 1796. A special election was held on October 11, 1796 (the same day as the 1796 general elections) to fill the resulting vacancy.

Joseph Hiester was a cousin of Daniel.

See also 
 United States House of Representatives elections, 1794 and 1795

References
Electoral data and information on districts are from the Wilkes University Elections Statistics Project

1794
Pennsylvania
United States House of Representatives